Bruce Ogilvie (April 4, 1953– April 13, 2009) was an American off-road motorcycle racer. He was a top American Motorcyclist Association (AMA) District 37 desert racer, winner of multiple Baja 500 and Baja 1000 races, and a long-time manager of American Honda’s off-road race team. Ogilvie was posthumously inducted into the AMA Motorcycle Hall of Fame in 2010.

Background
Born April 4, 1953 in Riverside, California, to Donald (Don) and Charlene Ogilvie, Bruce Ogilvie's amateur career led him to become one of the greatest desert racers ever to spring from AMA District 37 in Southern California.

Racing career
His Baja victories span over four decades. The first was a Baja 500 win in 1975, with another win in the 1000 later that year. He also competed in enduro events, winning a gold medal at the 1981 International Six Days Enduro. The International Six Day Trials, a form of off-road motorcycle Olympics, is the oldest annual competition sanctioned by the FIM dating back to 1913.

Ogilvie was the only man in history to win the Baja 1000 overall in four different decades, and he posted his last overall win in 2003 at the age of 51. He died on April 13, 2009 after a two-year battle with cancer.

Ogilvie was employed by American Honda beginning in 1984 where he served in many capacities over the years including, being in charge of Honda's off-road activities with motorcycle and ATV racing. Ogilvie was the lead developer of Honda CRF off-road race motorcycles. Prior to his death, he was the Senior Test Evaluator for Honda's Product Evaluation department.

References

External links 
 

1953 births
2009 deaths
American motorcycle racers
Off-road motorcycle racers
Enduro riders
Sportspeople from Riverside, California
Deaths from cancer in California